Theodore the Martyr refers to the two saints Theodore of Amasea (Theodore the Recruit) and Theodore Stratelates (Theodore the General), two important military saints of the Byzantine period.
The two saints are likely identical in origin, the veneration of Theodore of Amasea is ascertained for the late 4th century, while the tradition of Theodore Stratelates develops from that of Theodore of Amasea by the 9th century.
There is a Coptic Life of Theodore the General, which places his martyrdom in Egypt. In Coptic tradition, the saint is also known as Saint Theodore of Shwtp.

There are other martyrs called Theodore, see Theodore and Pausilippus (2nd c.), Theodore, Philippa and companions (3rd c.), Teodor Komogovinski (1788).

Accounts

According to the Book of the Saints of the Ethiopian Church, Saint Theodore the Martyr was a captain of the soldiers of the city of Setb, in the province of Asyut in Upper Egypt. A church was dedicated to him, and great signs and wonders took place through his body.
Abu al-Makarim, writing in 1348, says there was a church named after him in Babylon, Egypt.

Gregory of Nyssa (c. 335 – c. 395) gave an Oration on Theodore the Martyr in Amasia in 383, in the church where the saint's remains were said to be located.
This Theodore was a Roman soldier martyred around 303 in the time of the Emperor Maximian (c. 250 – 310).
He was among a surge of soldiers who were martyred in the 4th century.
He is described as "a poor soldier, newly conscripted."
Gregory said, "This, as we believe, is he who during the past year calmed the stormy fury of the barbarians, and stopped the terrible war of the savage Scythians".
He called on Theodore for assistance, saying "gather together the troops of thy brother martyrs, and thou with them beseech God to stay the invasion of the barbarians."
Gregory wrote, "The hues of the ornamentation in the church are veritably like a book that speaks, for painting even if silent knows how to speak from the wall."
This speech is often used in defense of the use of religious images.

The Emperor John I Tzimiskes fought a successful battle against the Russians in 970 in which the whole Greek army saw a champion on a white horse fighting before the first ranks. He disappeared after the battle was won.
The Russian prince Sviatoslav I of Kiev was forced to abandon Bulgaria and retreat to Russia.
The victory occurred on the anniversary of Saint Theodore the Martyr, and the army thought that the knight on the white horse was the saint.
The emperor repaired the church of Theodore in Euchaneia, and changed the name of that city to Theodoropolis.

Saint Theodore was the patron saint of the Capuchins. 
An observer in Rome in 1844 of a Capuchin's panegyric of Saint Theodore at the church dedicated to the martyr, on the saint's day, recorded as a sample,

Relics

Italy

In 1100 the remains of Saint Theodore the Martyr were stolen from Myra in Asia Minor and taken to Venice, along with the body of Saint Nicholas of Myra and his uncle, also Nicholas.
This occurred during an expedition to the Holy Land of about 200 ships  dispatched by the Doge Vitale Michiel of Venice under the spiritual leadership of Enrico Contarini, the Bishop of Olivolo.
Theodore the Martyr became one of the four tutelary guardians of Venice, along with the angel Gabriel, the Virgin Mary and Saint Mark the Evangelist. However, Saint Theodore was often used as a symbol of Venice's affiliation to Byzantium and as Venice became more independent, Saint Theodore's presence waned in the city.

In 1257 Jacopo Dauro raided Mesembria on the Bulgarian coast of the Black Sea, and took the headless body of Saint Theodore the Martyr from its church of Saint Sophia. The saint was headless because the Emperor Licinius had decapitated him after he had slain a dragon. A relative of Jacopo, Marco Dauro, took the body to Venice where he placed it in the church of San Salvador. Saint Theodore and the dragon were later commemorated in a statue on top of his column in Venice.
The Irish friar Simon Fitz-Simon passed through Venice in 1323 on his way to the Holy Land, and listed Theodore the Martyr among the bodies of saints that lay in the city, "whole and uncorrupted".

The Jesuit Richa in his History of the Churches of Florence recorded that at the Convent of our Lady of the Murate there was a rib of St. Theodore the Martyr, which had been mislaid and forgotten, but which the saint revealed in a vision to Sister Maria of Scarperia. 
The chronicle of the convent included many wonderful events associated with this relic.
An 1872 account tells of a small church of Theodore the Martyr at the foot of Palatine Hill in Rome. 
Mothers would bring their children to the church to kiss the saint's relic.

Elsewhere

At Thorney, Cambridgeshire, England, a new church was built by Abbott Gunther in 1069. In 1105 relics of Theodore the Martyr were translated to the church.
John of Glastonbury's Cronica sive Antiquitates Glastoniensis Ecclesie, written in the mid-14th century, recorded that Glastonbury Abbey had relics of Theodore the Martyr.

During the Fourth Crusade (1202–1204) the German monk Gunther of Pairis obtained a variety of relics, including a trace of the blood of Jesus.
The collection included a piece of the True Cross, a piece of Saint John the Baptist and the arm of Saint James the Great. 
There were relics of other saints including Theodore the Martyr.

The Clairvaux inventory of 1504 included a number of relics including the shoulder blade of Saint Theodore the Martyr.
The Dames de l'Assomption of rue Saint-Honoré in Paris, who rebuilt their church in 1670 at their own expense, preserved the body of Saint Theodore the Martyr with great veneration. It had been given to them by Cardinal Antonio Barberini, the Archbishop of Rheims.

Philip II of Spain (1527–1598) was a great collector of relics, and accumulated a huge collection. It included 290 teeth of Saint Apollonia, the patron saint of toothache.
His successors continued to add to the collection.
In 1762 it was reported that the body of Saint Theodore the Martyr was lying in a magnificent shrine of silver or brass gilt, adorned with crystals and gems and enameled with gold, in  the monastery of El Escorial near Madrid, Spain.

Notes

Sources

 

Christian martyrs